Tayo or TAYO may refer to:

Arts, entertainment, and media
 Tayo The Little Bus, a South Korean animated television series

Businesses and organizations
 Tayo (political party), a political party based in Mogadishu, Somalia
 TAYO Awards, an award program in the Philippines
 Tayo Rolls, Indian metal fabrication and processing company

People

Given name
 Tayo Adenaike (born 1954), Nigerian painter
 Tayo Aderinokun (1955–2011), Nigerian entrepreneur
 Tayo Ayeni (born 1962), Nigerian entrepreneur
 Tayo Edun (born 1998), British professional football player
 Tayo Fabuluje (born 1991), American football player
 Tayo Lamidi (born 1965), Nigerian academic
 Tayo Ogedengbe (born 1987), British basketball player
 Tayo Oviosu (born 1977), Nigerian, founder and CEO of Paga
 Tayo Popoola (born 1981), British musician and DJ
 Tayo Reed (born 1973), American country music singer
 Tayo Walbrugh (born 1996), South African cricketer

Surname
 Lyle Tayo (1889-1971), American film actress
 Michael Tayo (born 1987), Nigerian football player

Other uses
 Tayo Creole, a French-based Creole spoken in New Caledonia